Ralph Liguori (October 10, 1926 – July 21, 2020) was an American racing driver from New York City.

Indycar career
He competed in the USAC Championship Car series from 1957 to 1971 making 61 starts. His best finish was 2nd place at the Indiana State Fairgrounds Speedway in 1970.  1966 was his most active year when he made 7 starts and finished 28th in the National Championship.  He attempted the Indianapolis 500 six times (1959, 1962, 1963, 1964, 1967, and 1968) but he failed to make the field each time.  Liguori continued racing well into his seventies and won a minor race in 2000 at 73 years old.

NASCAR career
Liguori competed in 76 NASCAR Grand National Series races in his career. He had 30 Top 10 and 5 Top 5 finishes in his career. His best finish was a third-place finish at Wilson Speedway in Wilson, North Carolina. He finished tenth in the 1954 season points. Liguori made one start in the NASCAR Convertible Series during 1956.

Racing record

Complete Formula One results

References

External links
 

1926 births
2020 deaths
NASCAR drivers
Racing drivers from New York City
USAC Silver Crown Series drivers